Jai Veeru is a 2009 Indian Hindi-language action film directed by Puneet Sira, starring Fardeen Khan, Kunal Khemu, Anjana Sukhani, Dia Mirza and Arbaaz Khan. The film was released on 13 March 2009.

Plot

Veer "Veeru" Sharma  is a small-time crook working for a large drug importer, Tejpal. He is unaware that his best friend Jai Mehra is an undercover cop, seeking evidence against Tejpal. During a raid on Tejpal's warehouse, Veeru accidentally shoots Jai in the head but he miraculously survives and makes a full recovery. 

Veeru then flees to Bangkok and is subsequently arrested. Jai is assigned the task of bringing back Veeru to testify against Tejpal. They confront each other, and seem to find their friendship still exists. They both decide to be friends again, when Veeru claims he has Tejpal's diary, which includes all his secrets and dealings. In a twist of events, Jai and Veeru attack Tejpal at his hideout. Tejpal shoots Veeru, while Jai attacks Tejpal and kills him. Jai lets Veeru flee before the cops arrive. Since then,  the friendship of "Jai Veeru" lives on.

Cast

Soundtrack

The soundtrack of the film was composed by Bappa Lahiri, while the lyrics were penned by Sameer.

Track list

Critical response
Shubhra Gupta gave a negative review, writing ″Then they all get together and go looking for a plot. At one point, Veeru shoots Jai right in the middle of the forehead. The camera zooms in, and you see the hole, and the blood pouring out. Post-interval, Jai opens his eyes. Not even a bullet in the head can kill him. It's that kind of film.″ Taran Adarsh of Bollywood Hungama gave the film 1.5 stars out of 5, writing ″Fardeen Khan is below average. Kunal Khemu is better; the masses will like him. Dia Mirza and Anjana Sukhani don't have much to do, although Dia's character has an interesting twist in the climax. Arbaaz Khan is passable. Govind Namdeo is average. Rajesh Khattar and Rakesh Bedi are okay. On the whole, JAI VEERU has something for the hardcore masses, but nothing for the elite/classes. Its business, therefore, will be restricted to the single screens, but multiplexes will be terrible.″

Accolades

References

External links
 
 Read and rate reviews of Jai Veeru

2009 films
2000s Hindi-language films
Indian remakes of American films
Indian action films
2009 action films